Aarthi  is a 2005 soap opera that aired on Raj TV. The show starred Sithara, Vijay Adhiraj, Raja Ravindra and Y.Vijaya. The serial wass produced by AVM Productions. The story, screenplay and dialogue was by Devi Bala and it was directed by K. Rangaraj.

The music was composed by Dhina and the title song was penned by lyricist Vairamuthu and sung by Sadhana Sargam. The show ended with 1054 episodes.

Cast
 Sithara as Aarthi
 Vijay Adhiraj as Santhosh
 Raja Ravindra as Santhosh-Post surgery
 Y. Vijaya as Parvathi (Santho's mother)
Deepa Venkat
Nithya Ravindran
Manjari Vinodhini
Shakti Kumar
Ajay Kapoor
Monicka
Archana
Seetha
Bharath Kalyan
Jhanvi
Achamillai Gopi
Jayanth
Shilpa Mary Theresa
Sivakavitha
Premi
Daniel Balaji
SN.Lakshmi
J. Lalitha
Bombay Gnanam
Delhi Kumar
Shrikala Paramasivam
Sairam
M. Banumathi
KS. Jayalakshmi
Gayathri Priya
Engineer Srinivas
Santhi Anandraj

References

External links
 Raj TV Official Site 

Raj TV television series
2005 Tamil-language television series debuts
2008 Tamil-language television series endings
2000s Tamil-language television series
Tamil-language television shows